Salem Church may refer to:

in the United States

Old Salem Church and Cemetery, Catonsville, Maryland, listed on the National Register of Historic Places (NRHP)
 Salem Church (Sardis, Ohio), NRHP-listed
 Salem Church (Tulare, South Dakota), NRHP-listed
 Battle of Salem Church, Virginia

See also
Salem Church Parsonage, Menno, South Dakota, NRHP-listed
 Salem Evangelical Church (disambiguation)
 Salem Methodist Church (disambiguation)
 Salem Presbyterian Church (disambiguation)
 Salem Lutheran Church